Make It Rain may refer to:

Music
 "Make It Rain" (Fat Joe song), 2006
 "Make It Rain" (Foy Vance song), a song covered by Ed Sheeran in 2014
 "Make It Rain" (Pop Smoke song), 2020
 "Make It Rain" (Travis Porter song), 2010
 "Make It Rain", a 1969 song by Billy Mize
 "Make It Rain", a 1970 song by Orange Bicycle
 "Make It Rain", a 2010 single by Travis Porter from From Day 1
 "Make It Rain", a song by Tom Waits from Real Gone

Other uses
Make It Rain: The Love of Money, a 2014 mobile game by Space Inch

See also 
 Let It Rain (disambiguation)
 Make It Reign (disambiguation)
 Rainmaking, the idea of a person who can "make it rain"